Last Flight may refer to:

 Last Flight (album), a 2000 live album by Jefferson Airplane
 Last Flight (book), a 1937 book by Amelia Earhart
 "The Last Flight" (The Twilight Zone), a 1960 episode of the American television series The Twilight Zone
 The Last Flight (1931 film), a 1931 film starring Richard Barthelmess
 The Last Flight (2009 film), a 2009 French film starring Marion Cotillard
 Last Flight (film), a 2014 Chinese film starring Ed Westwick
 Last Flight, a cancelled Wii game by Bloober Team